Stanley Cohen (February 5, 1927 – March 27, 2017) was an American physicist who worked at Argonne National Laboratory. He created Speakeasy, a numerical computational environment, implemented with OOPS, object-oriented system, and was the founder and president of Speakeasy Computing Corporation.

References

External links
 
 

1927 births
American physicists
Argonne National Laboratory people
2017 deaths
American computer scientists